Thatcher most commonly refers to:
 Margaret Thatcher (1925–2013), former prime minister of the United Kingdom
 A professional who installs thatch as a roofing material, i.e. by means of thatching

Thatcher may also refer to:

People
 Thatcher baronets, a baronetcy created for Denis Thatcher, the husband of Margaret Thatcher

Surname
 America Iglesias Thatcher (1907–1989), Puerto-Rican labor activist
 Ben Thatcher (born 1975), retired Welsh footballer
 Betty Thatcher (1944–2011), English writer and lyricist
 Carol Thatcher (born 1953), daughter of Margaret Thatcher
 Colin Thatcher (born 1938), former Saskatchewan cabinet minister and convicted murderer
 Denis Thatcher (1915–2003), husband of Margaret Thatcher
 Eva Thatcher (1862–1942), American film actress
 Frank Thatcher, Dean of St George's Cathedral, Georgetown, Guyana
 Frederick Thatcher (1814–1890), English and New Zealand architect and clergyman
 George Thatcher (1754–1824), American lawyer
 Heather Thatcher (1896–1987), English actress
 Henry Thatcher (1806–1880), American admiral
 Henry Calvin Thatcher (1842—1884), the first Chief Justice of the Colorado Supreme Court
 James Thatcher (MP) ( 1536–1565), English politician
 James Thatcher, American horn player
 Joe Thatcher (born 1981), American Major League Baseball pitcher
 J. T. Thatcher (born 1978), American football player
 Karen Thatcher (born 1984), American ice hockey player
 Kim Thatcher (born 1964), American politician
 Les Thatcher (born 1940), American wrestler
 Mark Thatcher (born 1953), son of Margaret Thatcher
 Maurice Thatcher (1870–1973), U.S. Congressman
 Moses Thatcher (1842–1909), American Mormon apostle
 Noel Thatcher, British paralympic athlete
 Raymond S. Thatcher (1903–1988), American politician
 Richard Thatcher (1846–1909), American POW and university president
 Roger Thatcher (1926–2010), British statistician
 Roland Thatcher (born 1977), American golfer
 Ross Thatcher (1917–1971), 9th Premier of Saskatchewan
 Samuel Thatcher (1776–1872), member of the United States House of Representatives from Maine
 Sophie Thatcher, American actress
 Torin Thatcher (1905–1981), English actor

Given name
 Thatcher Demko (born 1995), American ice hockey player
 Thatcher Szalay (born 1979), American football player

Fictional characters
 Becky Thatcher and Judge Thatcher, characters in Tom Sawyer, by Mark Twain
 Inspector Margaret Thatcher, a character on the television series Due South
 Jeremy Thatcher, a character in the children's novel Jeremy Thatcher, Dragon Hatcher
 John Putnam Thatcher, a character in novels by Emma Lathen
 Justine Thatcher, a character in the BBC Scotland drama Monarch of the Glen
 Margaret Thatcher, a character in the television series The Adventures of Tom Sawyer
 Thatcher, code name of Mike Baker, a playable character in the game Tom Clancy's Rainbow Six Siege
 Thatcher Grey, a character in the TV show Grey's Anatomy
 Walter Parks Thatcher, a character in the film Citizen Kane
 William Thatcher, protagonist in the film A Knight's Tale

Places
 Thatcher, Arizona, U.S.
 Thatcher, Colorado, U.S.
 Thatcher, Idaho, U.S.
 Thatcher, Nebraska, U.S.
 Thatcher Peninsula, South Georgia and the South Sandwich Islands

Other uses
 , the name of more than one U.S. ship
 Thatchers Cider, a drink
 C/1861 G1 (Thatcher), a comet

See also

 Thacher (disambiguation)
 Thacker (disambiguation)
 Margaret Thatcher (disambiguation)
 Thatcherism, the conviction, economic, social and political style of Margaret Thatcher
 Thatcher effect, an optical illusion involving facial recognition

English-language surnames
Occupational surnames
English-language occupational surnames